Molteni was an Italian professional road bicycle racing team from 1958 until the end of 1976. It won 663 races, many of them earned by its most famous rider, Eddy Merckx. Other riders included Gianni Motta and Marino Basso, who contributed 48 and 34 wins respectively. The Molteni family continues in cycling with sponsorship of Salmilano.

The sponsors Molteni were Italian salami manufacturers based in Arcore, near Milan.

History

The Molteni team began in 1958 with Renato Molteni as team manager. It was started by Pietro Molteni. The team was also managed by his son, Ambrogio Molteni, a former professional rider. The former Italian road champion, Giorgio Albani, finished his career with Molteni in 1959 and came back two years later as directeur sportif. The team had success with Gianni Motta in the 1966 Giro d'Italia and Michele Dancelli in the classics. Merckx joined at the end of 1970, having twice won the Tour de France and two editions of the Giro d'Italia. Molteni became predominantly Belgian and took many of Merckx's teammates from Faemino–Faema, including his directeur sportif, Guillaume Driessens. Albani replaced Driessens and directed the team with Robert Lelangue from 1972 to 1976. Other directeurs sportifs included Marino Fontana. After 1976 Molteni retired from the peloton.

Major wins

Tour de France General classification 1971, 1972, 1974 (Merckx)
Giro d'Italia General classification 1966 (Motta), 1972, 1973, 1974 (Merckx)
Vuelta a España General classification 1973 (Merckx)
 World Championships road race 1966 (Rudi Altig) 1971 and 1974 (Merckx)
Giro di Lombardia 1964, 1971, 1972
 road race championships 1964, 1965, 1966, 1967
 road race championships 1968, 1969, 1970
 road race championships 1971
Trofeo Baracchi 1964, 1972
Tour de Romandie General classification 1966 
Tour de Suisse General classification 1967, 1974
Tour de Luxembourg General classification 1968, 1969, 1970
Paris–Luxembourg General classification 1968
Milan–San Remo 1970, 1971, 1972, 1975, 1976
Critérium du Dauphiné Libéré General classification 1971
Liège–Bastogne–Liège 1971, 1972, 1973, 1975, 1976
Omloop Het Volk 1971, 1973, 1974, 1975
Rund um den Henninger-Turm 1971
Tour of Belgium General classification 1971, 1972
Paris-Nice General classification 1971 (Merckx)
Grand Prix des Nations 1972, 1973
E3 Prijs Vlaanderen 1973
Amstel Gold Race 1973, 1975 (Merckx)
Gent–Wevelgem 1973
Paris–Brussels 1973
Paris–Roubaix 1973
Tour of Flanders 1975

Notable riders
Rudi Altig
Peter Post
Franco Balmamion
Michele Dancelli
Gianni Motta
Marino Basso
Eddy Merckx
Herman Van Springel
Roger Swerts
Joseph Bruyère

References

Further reading

External links

Defunct cycling teams based in Italy
Cycling teams established in 1958
Cycling teams disestablished in 1976